was a town located in Naga District, Wakayama Prefecture, Japan.

As of 2003, the town had an estimated population of 8,814 and a density of 313.44 persons per km2. The total area was 28.12 km2.

On November 11, 2005, Naga, along with the towns of Kishigawa, Kokawa, Momoyama and Uchita (all from Naga District), was merged to create the city of Kinokawa.

External links
Kinokawa city 

Dissolved municipalities of Wakayama Prefecture
Kinokawa, Wakayama